Vandalur taluk is a taluk in Chengalpattu district of the Indian state of Tamil Nadu. The headquarters of the taluk is the town of Vandalur.

History
Vandalur  taluk was previously a part of the Kanchipuram district. After the bifurcation of Kanchipuram district, Vandalur taluk became a part of the Chengalpattu district.

Administration
The taluk is administered by the Tahsildar office located in Vandalur. The revenue officers from Chengalpattu manage the revenue collection.

References 

 
Taluks of Chengalpattu district